Gerolamo de Caro (died 1560) was a Roman Catholic prelate who served as Titular Archbishop of Nazareth (1536–1552), Titular Bishop of Cannae (1531–1536), and Bishop of Monteverde (1521–1531).

Biography
On 3 Mar 1521, Gerolamo de Caro was appointed during the papacy of Pope Leo X as Bishop of Monteverde.
On 3 Jul 1531, he was appointed during the papacy of Pope Clement VII as Titular Bishop of Cannae.
In Nov 1536, he was appointed during the papacy of Pope Paul III as Titular Archbishop of Nazareth.
He served as Titular Archbishop of Nazareth until his resignation on 16 Feb 1552. 
He died on 8 Nov 1560.

References

External links and additional sources
 (for Chronology of Bishops) 
 (for Chronology of Bishops)  

16th-century Italian Roman Catholic bishops
Bishops appointed by Pope Leo X
Bishops appointed by Pope Clement VII
Bishops appointed by Pope Paul III
1560 deaths